The Men's time trial B road cycling event at the 2016 Summer Paralympics took place on the afternoon of 14 September at Flamengo Park, Pontal. 24 riders (with pilots) competed over two laps of a fifteen kilometre course.

The B classification is for cyclists with visual impairment. Sighted guides act as pilots in these events, which take place on tandem bikes. 
The event was won by British riders Steve Bate and pilot Adam Duggleby, adding to their gold medal on the track in the individual pursuit. Road race gold medalist Vincent ter Schure, piloted by Timo Fransen took the silver for the Netherlands, and Australia's Kieran Modra won the bronze.

Results
Men's road time trial B. 14 September 2016, Rio.

References

Men's road time trial B